Brit Floyd is a Pink Floyd tribute band formed in 2011 in Liverpool, United Kingdom. Their live shows attempt to emulate and recreate the sound and soundscape of Pink Floyd's live shows. Damian Darlington formed the band after playing with The Australian Pink Floyd Show for 17 years.

History

Brit Floyd originated in 2011 on the initiative of musical director, guitarist, and singer Damian Darlington "simply because he felt he could do it one better" than his previous band, The Australian Pink Floyd Show. He continued: "There is much more attention to details in every aspect of the show, from the music to the visuals to the lighting: everything is that much more perfected and there's a passion coming off that stage... It's a coherent, emotional journey through Pink Floyd's catalog."

Darlington began following Pink Floyd's work after hearing The Wall at the age of 13 and he saw the band live for the first time in 1987 during the A Momentary Lapse of Reason Tour. "Since then, he has seen the band in different incarnations, after its split, and including its 2005 reunion."

Regarding his growing up listening to the band, Darlington stated: "I definitely listened to Pink Floyd. I remember 'Another Brick in the Wall' being No.1 in the UK. It was December 1979. Probably my first memory of Pink Floyd. Then I actually heard The Wall album in its entirety and that's what particularly drew me to Pink Floyd about the age of 12 or 13. I was fascinated by the record that told a story, and all these sound effects linking songs together, and also the wonderful guitar work. I was already learning to play guitar and I wanted to learn to play some of these wonderful guitar solos. That was my introduction to Pink Floyd. I was a fan from quite an early age."

After playing in a number of bands over the years covering a wide range of music including Country, Western, and even Jazz, Darlington played with The Australian Pink Floyd Show from 1994 to 2011 (Darlington is not the only veteran of The Australian Pink Floyd Show in Brit Floyd, "several others in Brit Floyd" have been a part of the band as well). Darlington wanted to parlay his experience with The Australian Pink Floyd Show into something more nuanced: “I felt it was time to do it in a different way with a different group of musicians — to strike out on my own, I’ve had a lot of experience and have learned how to do this correctly.” Darlington says his group pays greater attention to detail, presenting a more polished show: “If you’ve seen the Australian show, you’ll notice a difference in a big way — a difference for the better, we make the extra effort to re-create as much as we can and it’s not just the songs: It’s the visuals, as well.”

The band has toured extensively since 2011 and has featured guest musicians from Pink Floyd's studio and touring band line-ups. Pink Floyd bass player and vocalist Guy Pratt joined Brit Floyd on stage at Echo Arena Liverpool on 9November 2013, and saxophonist and rhythm guitarist Scott Page joined them at Los Angeles's Orpheum Theatre on 17 June 2015, playing "Money" and "Us and Them" with the band.

In 2016 the band embarked on "a massive 76-date US tour" featuring "an extended career-spanning setlist that will include a performance of Pink Floyd’s 24-minute epic "Echoes" and including a "million dollar stage design."

At the conclusion of their 2022 world tour, it was announced that the band had parted ways with CMP Entertainment and partnered with Palladium Entertainment. Due to the split, the band had to make all new social media profiles along with a brand new website. With the announcement of the label change, the band also confirmed their plans for a 2023 world tour celebrating the 50th anniversary of Pink Floyd's 1973 album, The Dark Side of The Moon.  

As of January 19, 2023, the fiasco between present and past management has escalated to the point where tickets are being sold to five questionable shows which are not listed as part of the 2023 tour on the bands official web page.  One of the band members has publicly stated "we these musicians and creatives have permanently left CMP Entertainment and we won't be on stage for any concerts promoted by CMP or WME."  These shows are as follows:

- Lancaster, PA (American Music Theater): March 9, 2023

- Wallingford, CT (Oakdale Theater): March 10, 2023

- Shipshewana, IN (Blue Gate Theater): March 24, 2023

- Detroit, MI (Fox Theater): March 26, 2023

- Morrison, CO (Red Rocks Amphitheater): June 9, 2023

Band members
Various musicians have played in Brit Floyd since its inception in 2011. The present band members are:

 Damian Darlington – Musical Director, guitar, lap steel, vocals (2011–present)
 Gareth Darlington – Sound Designer and Front of House Engineer (2011–present)
 Bryan Kolupski – Media Director – Animation and Video (2011–present)
 Matt Riddle – keyboards, vocals 
 Ian Cattell – bass guitar, vocals (2011–present)
 Arran Ahmun – drums (2011–present)
 Edo Scordo - guitars, vocals (2015–present) 
 Jenn Kee - backing vocals (2016–present)
 Ryan Saranich - saxophones, guitars, percussions, keyboard (2016–present)
 Eva Avila - backing vocals (2018–present)
 Ella Chi - backing vocals (2018–present)
 Andrea Pellegrini - Sound Designer and Front of House Engineer (2017-present)
 Randy Cooke - drums (2021-present)

Past members
 Amy Smith – backing vocals (2011)
 Rosalee O'Connell - backing vocals (2013)
 Carl Brunsdon – saxophone, percussion, guitar, bass guitar (2011–2015)
 Bobby Harrison – guitar, vocals (2011–2015)
 Ola Bienkowska – backing vocals (2011–2022)
 Emily Jollands – backing vocals (2011–2016)
 Jacquie Williams – backing vocals (2011–2022)
 Angela Cervantes - backing vocals (2013–2017)
 Thomas Ashbrook - keyboards, vocals (2013–2017)
 Roberta Freeman - backing vocals (2014–2017)
 Karl Penny - drums (2014–2019)
 Jay Davidson - saxophones, guitars, percussions, keyboard (2015–2018)

Citations

Further reading

 Brain Damage UK News Story July 2015 by Ed Lopez-Reyes

External links
 www.britfloydofficial.com

Tribute bands
Musical groups established in 2011
2011 establishments in the United Kingdom
Pink Floyd
Musical groups from Liverpool